Charles Whittingham may refer to

 Charles Whittingham (1767–1840), English printer 
 Charles Whittingham (1795–1876), English printer 
 Charles E. Whittingham (1913–1999), American thoroughbred horse trainer
 Charles Whittingham (priest) (1664–1743), Irish Anglican priest